Kaimaumau is a locality on the northeast side of Rangaunu Harbour and on west side of the Aupouri Peninsula of Northland, New Zealand.

In October 2020, the Government committed $65,643 from the Provincial Growth Fund to upgrade Kaimaumau Marae, creating 23 jobs.

A scrub fire in the Kaimaumau wetland north of the town began on 18 December 2021 and continued to burn over a 2,800 hectare area for months, forcing the evacuation of Kaimaumau twice. Firefighting has cost over $7 million as of mid-April 2022, with the fire still burning. A large fire also affected the peat land in 1988.

History

Kaimaumau was an important location for the late 19th/early 20th century kauri gum digging trade. In the 1910s, the lower quality chip gum found at the southern half of the Aupouri Peninsula greatly increased in value.

Demographics
Statistics New Zealand describes Kaimaumau as a rural settlement. Kaimaumau is part of the larger Rangaunu Harbour statistical area.

Kaimaumau had a population of 153 at the 2018 New Zealand census, an increase of 18 people (13.3%) since the 2013 census, and an increase of 9 people (6.2%) since the 2006 census. There were 51 households, comprising 81 males and 69 females, giving a sex ratio of 1.17 males per female. The median age was 47.2 years (compared with 37.4 years nationally), with 27 people (17.6%) aged under 15 years, 15 (9.8%) aged 15 to 29, 75 (49.0%) aged 30 to 64, and 33 (21.6%) aged 65 or older.

Ethnicities were 68.6% European/Pākehā, 47.1% Māori, 5.9% Pacific peoples, 2.0% Asian, and 2.0% other ethnicities. People may identify with more than one ethnicity.

Of those people who chose to answer the census's question about religious affiliation, 35.3% had no religion, 35.3% were Christian, 13.7% had Māori religious beliefs and 2.0% had other religions.

Of those at least 15 years old, 12 (9.5%) people had a bachelor or higher degree, and 36 (28.6%) people had no formal qualifications. The median income was $19,300, compared with $31,800 nationally. 9 people (7.1%) earned over $70,000 compared to 17.2% nationally. The employment status of those at least 15 was that 45 (35.7%) people were employed full-time, 18 (14.3%) were part-time, and 12 (9.5%) were unemployed.

References

Far North District
Populated places in the Northland Region